The Divriği B-Kafa mine is a large mine in the east of Turkey in Sivas Province 245 km east of the capital, Ankara. Divriği B-Kafa represents the largest iron reserve in Turkey having estimated reserves of 50 million tonnes of ore grading 55% iron. The 50 million tonnes of ore contains 27.5 million tonnes of iron metal.

References

External links 
 Official site

Iron mines in Turkey
Buildings and structures in Sivas Province